Robert Campbell Scarlett, 2nd Baron Abinger DL (5 September 1794 – 24 June 1861), was a British barrister-at-law and politician.

Background and early life
Born in London, he was the oldest son of James Scarlett, 1st Baron Abinger, and his first wife, third daughter of Peter Campbell. In 1844, he succeeded his father as baron. Scarlett was educated at Trinity College, Cambridge, where he graduated with a Bachelor of Arts in 1815, and a Master of Arts three years later, when he was called to the bar by the Inner Temple.

In 1837, Lord Abinger was the presiding exchequer judge in the case of Priestley v Fowler which introduced the now abandoned legal rule of common employment.

Political career
In 1835, he entered the British House of Commons, representing Norwich until 1838. He sat again for Horsham from 1841 until 1844, when his father died. Scarlett was appointed Deputy Lieutenant of Inverness-shire in 1854.

Family
He married Sarah Smith, second daughter of George Smith, Chief Justice of Mauritius, in 1824, and they had at least one son, William, who succeeded his father as third Baron.

References

"Abinger, Baron (Scarlett) (Baron UK 1835)." Debrett's Peerage & Baronetage 1995. London: Debrett's Peerage Limited, 1995. pp. 8–9.

External links 
 

1794 births
1861 deaths
Alumni of Trinity College, Cambridge
English barristers
Deputy Lieutenants of Inverness-shire
Members of the Inner Temple
Members of the Parliament of the United Kingdom for English constituencies
UK MPs 1835–1837
UK MPs 1837–1841
UK MPs 1841–1847
UK MPs who inherited peerages
Robert 2
Eldest sons of British hereditary barons